Vittorio Dagianti (born 10 May 1919 in Rome; died 4 June 1994) was an Italian professional football player and coach.

He played for 6 seasons (82 games, 7 goals) in the Serie A for S.S. Lazio, A.S. Roma, Salernitana Calcio 1919 and S.S.C. Napoli.

References

1919 births
1994 deaths
Italian footballers
Serie A players
S.S. Lazio players
U.S. Salernitana 1919 players
A.S. Roma players
S.S.C. Napoli players
S.S. Chieti Calcio players
Italian football managers
Association football midfielders